Paul Francis O'Kane is a Scottish Labour politician who has served as a Member of the Scottish Parliament (MSP) for the West Scotland region since 2021.

Early life 
Born in Paisley and raised in Neilston, O'Kane attended St Luke's High School in Barrhead where he was Head Boy. From there he went onto study at the University of Glasgow for an MA (Hons) in English Literature and Politics.
Whilst attending the University of Glasgow, he was chair of the University Labour Club.

Political career 
Paul O'Kane has been a Member of the Scottish Parliament for West Scotland since the 2021 Scottish Parliament Election. He has served as Deputy Convenor of the Health, Social Care and Sport Committee since 2021 and Scottish Labour Shadow Minister for Public Health, Social Care and Drugs Policy.

Paul served as a member of East Renfrewshire Council from 2012 representing the people of Neilston, Uplawmoor and Newton Mearns North and served as Deputy Education convenor. He was re-elected in 2017 to represent the new council ward Newton Mearns North and Neilston following boundary changes and became Deputy Leader of East Renfrewshire Council as well as Convenor for Education and Equalities. He was the Scottish Labour group leader on the council from 2017 to 2021.
He stood down as a Councillor at the 2022 Council Elections.

Personal life 
Prior to being an MSP Paul worked in the charity sector. He is openly gay and the first openly gay man elected to the Scottish Parliament for Scottish Labour. Paul married his husband, Alan in August 2021.

References

External links 
 

Year of birth missing (living people)
Living people
Labour MSPs
Members of the Scottish Parliament 2021–2026
LGBT members of the Scottish Parliament
21st-century British politicians
People from East Renfrewshire
Politicians from Paisley, Renfrewshire
Alumni of the University of Glasgow